Hotel Nikko Palau is a 5-star hotel in Palau. It is operated by the Japanese hotelier firm Hotel Nikko.
It is one of the oldest hotels in Palau.

References

 The Edge of Paradise: America in Micronesia - Paul Frederick Kluge. pp. 204–205.

Hotels in Palau